Temminck's courser (Cursorius temminckii) is a bird in the pratincole and courser family, Glareolidae. It is a wader which lives in sub-Saharan Africa. It is noted for laying its dark ash-black eggs in the burnt bushes and grass of the African savannah.

Subspecies

There are three subspecies of Temminck's courser:

C. t. temminckii, (Swainson, 1822): Senegal to Ethiopia, Kenya and northern Tanzania 
C. t. ruvanensis, (Madarász, 1915): southern Tanzania to Angola, Mozambique & northeast South Africa
C. t. aridus, (Clancey, 1989): northern Namibia to western Zimbabwe

This bird's common name and Latin binomial commemorate the Dutch naturalist Coenraad Jacob Temminck.

References

 Temminck's courser - Species text in The Atlas of Southern African Birds.

Temminck's courser
Birds of Sub-Saharan Africa
Birds described in 1822
Taxa named by William John Swainson